Cwmbran (also in use as an alternative spelling in English) is a town in the county borough of Torfaen in South Wales.

Lying within the historic boundaries of Monmouthshire, Cwmbran was designated as a New Town in 1949 to provide new employment opportunities in the south eastern portion of the South Wales Coalfield.

Geography
Comprising the villages of Old Cwmbran, Pontnewydd, Upper Cwmbran, Henllys, Croesyceiliog, Llantarnam and Llanyrafon, its population had grown to 48,535 by 2011. This makes it the sixth largest urban area in Wales.

The Afon Llwyd forms the major river valley, although the most significant water course is probably the remains of the Monmouthshire & Brecon Canal. To the east of Cwmbran the land is less hilly, forming part of the Usk valley.

Etymology 
The name of the town in Welsh means "valley of the crow",). 

Cwmbran was the name of one of several villages located in the valley, which had grown up around the tinplate works of the Cwmbran Iron Company. As the new town of Cwmbran was formed in 1949, the area of the old village became known as Old Cwmbran.

History 
Cwmbran was founded in 1949 as a new town, to provide new employment opportunities in the south eastern portion of the South Wales Coalfield, but the area has a long history.

There is evidence that Neolithic and Bronze Age people used the area, with the Iron Age Silures tribe also occupying the region before being subdued by the Roman legions based at nearby Usk and Caerleon.

Around 1179, Hywel, Lord of Caerleon gave a gift of money and land to found the Cistercian abbey at Llantarnam. At the dissolution of the monasteries by Henry VIII the abbey was closed and was bought by a succession of wealthy landowners. By the 18th century the abbey had passed into the ownership of the Blewitt family, who were to become key figures in the early industrialisation of Cwmbran. Brick making, lime kilns, iron ore mining, quarrying and coal mining were established during this period, along with a canal to transport goods to the docks at Newport.

In 1833 the Ordnance Survey map of Monmouthshire shows Cwmbran as a farm situated in the area now known as Upper Cwmbran, in the valley named Cwm Brân.

Following some investigation by local residents Richard Davies and Mike Price, the Ancient Cwmbran & The Cistercian project was created and a £48,000 grant has been provided by the Heritage Lottery Fund to explore some previously unrecorded sites of interest in the Greenmeadow and Thornhill areas.

The Cistercian Way also passes through Llantarnam, Old Cwmbran, Greenmeadow and Thornhill before reaching the ancient chapel of Llanderfel on Mynydd Maen, and then onwards to Twmbarlwm.

In the 19th and 20th centuries, Cwmbran was the site of heavy industrial development. Coal and iron ore were extracted on Mynydd Maen, and moved by inclined planes and tramways into the Eastern Valley for use in factories such as the Patent Nut and Bolt Company (which became Guest Keen and Nettlefolds in 1900), various tin plate works and brickworks. This industry drove the creation of the Monmouthshire Canal, the Newport and Pontypool Railway and the Pontypool, Caerleon and Newport Railway. Very little of this industrial heritage remains today, though many of today's light industrial or retail estates were created on the sites.

Following the 1946 New Towns Act, ministries and county councils were asked to nominate sites for housing. For Wales, the Ministry of Housing and Local Government proposed Church Village and Cwmbran. The Church Village proposal was vetoed by the Ministry of Power as new housing there would have interfered with plans for the expansion of coal mining in the area; however, Cwmbran was passed in 1949.

Cwmbran was a civil parish and, from 1974, a community in its own right, one of only five in the new district of Torfaen. In 1985 the Cwmbran community was abolished, replaced by Cwmbran Central, Fairwater, Llantarnam, Pontnewydd and Upper Cwmbran.

Economy
The longest established employer in Cwmbran is biscuit maker Burton's Foods, who employ 1000 people to make its Jammie Dodgers and Wagon Wheels biscuits. As of 2005, the Cwmbran plant produces over 400 million Wagon Wheels a year.

Safran Seats Great Britain (formerly Zodiac Aerospace) is the current owner of a factory in Cwmbran which employs 1000 people for manufacturing aircraft seats.

Cwmbran Centre

Constructed from 1959 to 1981, the pedestrianised Centre hosts supermarkets, high street retailers, banks, theatre, cinema, bowling alley, restaurants, creche, trampoline park, gym, police station, magistrates court, youth centre, pub, library, arts centre and office space. The 170+ shops can be accessed by the bus station located in the Centre, a train station a few minutes walk north-east or with the 3000 free parking spaces located around the Centre's ring road.

SME-businesses include the Cwmbran Brewery in Upper Cwmbran, which opened in 1996 as Cottage Spring Brewery.

Education
The town has two secondary education schools: Croesyceiliog School and Cwmbran High School. There are numerous primary and nursery schools including a Welsh medium primary school, Ysgol Gymraeg Cwmbrân.

‘Crownbridge Special School’ is located in Cwmbran. Age range - 2-19 years old. 

Further education, vocational training and some higher education is provided at Torfaen Learning Zone of Coleg Gwent in Cwmbran centre.

Sport 

Cwmbran Stadium is a multipurpose Stadium with an athletics track and 3G Pitch, an eight court sports hall, fitness suite, swimming pool and an indoor bowling rink.

Athletics 
Cwmbran Stadium was home to international athletics events in the 1970s and 1980s. British athletics coach Malcolm Arnold used to train some of his athletes at Cwmbran in the 80s and early 90s while he was the Welsh National Coach.

Athletes who trained there regularly under Malcolm include former World 110m Hurdle Champion and World Record Holder, Colin Jackson; Commonwealth 110m Hurdle medallist, Paul Gray; and Nigel Walker who had two sporting careers, first as an Olympic hurdler and then later as a Welsh rugby union international player.

The 1999 World Indoor 400m Champion Jamie Baulch also used the stadium as a regular training track under a different coach. The stadium is also the home of Gwent Hockey Club (men's and ladies).

The town has three athletics clubs: Cwmbran Harriers, Fairwater Runners and Griffithstown Harriers.

Football 
The three main football teams in Cwmbran are Cwmbran Town, Cwmbran Celtic and Croesyceilog who all compete in the Welsh Football League. Cwmbran Town and Celtic both play at Cwmbran Stadium. Also in Cwmbran was The Football Factory. Located near to the town centre, The Football Factory was an indoor sports complex consisting of two sports pitches. The building was destroyed by fire in February 2017.

Rugby union 
Separate grounds at Pontnewydd, Croesyceiliog and Glan-Yr-Afon Leisure Centre house the town's three rugby union teams, Cwmbran RFC, Croesyceiliog RFC and Girling RFC.

although many more of the town's residents support the rugby teams of the older, adjacent town of Pontypool, the city of Newport and the Newport Gwent Dragons regional team.

Rugby league 
Rugby league is represented in the town by Torfaen Tigers, who play in the fourth tier of the rugby league pyramid system, the Conference League South. They play their home matches at the Kings Head Ground, home of Cwmbran R.F.C.

Media

The main newspaper in the region is the South Wales Argus and the semi-national Western Mail. The digital edition of the latter is published as Wales Online. The town is served by a local news service, Cwmbran Life, while the BBC also serve the South East Wales region from their base in Cardiff.

A number of online and amateur radio stations operate in Cwmbran. Vitalize Radio operates as the community radio station for Torfaen, originally established in 2014 as Torfonix. There are also the Cwmbran and District Amateur Radio Society, and Able Radio, who support adults with autism and learning disabilities.

Media depictions of Cwmbran 
In July 2011, Cwmbran was the setting for Goldie Lookin Chain's satirical "Fresh Prince of Cwmbran", a song based on the Fresh Prince of Bel-Air theme praising the town.

Transport

Rail 

Cwmbran railway station is served by trains on the Welsh Marches Line, with through trains south to Newport and Cardiff. Northbound local trains serve Pontypool and Abergavenny, and longer distance services run to Hereford, Shrewsbury, Wrexham, Crewe, Holyhead and Manchester. The station was not opened until 1986, as one of the last acts of the Cwmbran New Town Development Board.

Until then, Cwmbran had had no train service for 24 years. Historically Cwmbran was served by two lines and several local stations. The first line was built by the Monmouthshire Railway and Canal Company and opened in 1852. Much of its route is now under Cwmbran Drive, the A4051. The line that is still in use was opened by the Pontypool, Caerleon and Newport Railway in 1874.

Bus 

The town has a comprehensive local bus service from Cwmbran bus station.

Newport Bus operate their 29B and 24X services from Newport bus station at Friars Walk shopping centre to Cwmbran bus station, with frequency varying from every 15 minutes, every 30 minutes, and at off peak times every hour.

Stagecoach South Wales operate the majority of services at Cwmbran, including routes from the valleys including Blaenavon, Abergavenny, Paris, Pontypool, Blackwood, Varteg, and Hereford, travelling through to the South to Cardiff and Newport.

In early 2019 Stagecoach updated their fleet when they introduced newer model Gold Optare Solo buses for routes 1, 2, 5b/c, 6, 7 and 24. The X24 route to Newport Friars Walk and Blaenavon was upgraded to Stagecoach Gold in 2014.

Phil Anslow Coaches are a local coach company who also run services in the town. They operate the 63 service to Chepstow, the 24X route to Newport Friars Walk, the 6 service to Ty-Canol & Fairwater, the A3 service to Abergavenny via Pontypool, the 62 service to Coleg Gwent Ebbw Vale campus via Pontypool, and the 68 service to Usk College.

Partner Cities 
Bruchsal in Baden-Württemberg, Germany

Notable people 

See also :Category:People from Cwmbran

Sioned Williams (born 1971) – Plaid Cymru member of the Senedd for South Wales West (Senedd electoral region)
John Williams (VC) (born 1857, died 1932) – real name John Fielding, Zulu War and Rorke's Drift veteran, born in Abergavenny, buried in Llantarnam.
Ivor Bulmer-Thomas (born 1905, died 1993) – former Member of Parliament (MP) and church preservation campaigner.
Margaret Price (born 1941, died 2011) – opera singer.
Baroness Kingsmill (born 1947) – Labour life peer, personal injury, trade union and employment law solicitor, and business advisor.
Green Gartside (born 1955) – singer with Scritti Politti.
Andy Dibble (born 1965) – professional footballer.
Lee Dainton (born 1973) – TV presenter, host of Dirty Sanchez.
Ceri Dallimore (born 1974) – Commonwealth Games gold medal winning markswoman.
Ian Gough (born 1976) – Newport Gwent Dragons, Ospreys and 64 cap Welsh Rugby Union international.
Gary Lockett (born 1976) – world title challenging boxer and TV/radio analyst.
Helen Adams (born 1978) – Big Brother contestant and TV presenter.
Danny Gabbidon (born 1979) professional footballer for Cardiff City and Wales.
Jamie Arthur (born 1979) – Commonwealth Games medal winning boxer.
Rachel Rice (born 1984) – ''Big Brother'
Christian Doidge (born 1992) – professional footballer for Hibernian.
Nick Kenny (born 1993) – darts player and Welsh international.
Dave Richards (born 1993) – professional footballer for Crewe Alexandra
Theo Wharton (born 1994) – Cardiff City Academy graduate and Wales youth international.
Kim & Michael Davies, Robot Wars UK competitors and champions with Panic Attack.
Connor Edwards (born 1997) – Professional rugby player - Doncaster Knights, Newport Gwent Dragons
Cory McKenna (born 1999) _ Professional mixed martial artist

Notable Sights

Cwmbran Boating Lake Park
Cwmbran Leisure 
Cwmbran Town Centre
Cwmbran Retail Park
Cwmbran Stadium
Greenmeadow Community Farm
Llanyrafon Manor - Rural Heritage Centre

Bibliography

References

External links

Ancient Cwmbrân Society
Cwmbran's War Dead
Cwmbran Life
 Thomas and Elizabeth Morgan, married 81 years
 Greenmeadow Community Farm

 
Towns in Torfaen
New towns in Wales
New towns started in the 1940s
Former communities of Wales
Former civil parishes of Wales